Faryab Higher Education Institute is a college that was founded in 1977. Faryab promoted pedagogy with education and agriculture faculties. It has 637 students, and 36 professors. This Institute is a non-profit public higher education institution located in the large town of Maymana (population range of 50,000-249,999 inhabitants), Faryab. Faryab University (FU) is a very small (enrollment range: 500-999 students) coeducational higher education institution.

See also 
List of universities in Afghanistan

References 

Universities and colleges in Afghanistan
Faryab Province
1977 establishments in Afghanistan
Educational institutions established in 1977